Marduk is a Swedish black metal band formed in Norrköping in 1990. The band released their debut full-length album, Dark Endless, in 1992 on No Fashion Records. Their name is derived from the Ancient Babylonian deity, Marduk.

History
Morgan Steinmeyer Håkansson, the band's guitarist, formed Marduk with the intention of being the "most blasphemous band in the world". Concerning the band's two initial releases, the 1991 EP, Fuck Me Jesus, and their debut album, Dark Endless, released the subsequent year, Marduk can be sonically defined as black metal which interwove significant influence from death metal. For both of these releases, the band's lineup consisted of the aforementioned Morgan, Andreas 'Dread' Axelsson as vocalist, Magnus 'Devo' Andersson as guitarist, Rikard Kalm as bassist, and Joakim 'Av Gravf' Göthberg as drummer, while Dan Swanö of Edge of Sanity mixed both albums.

Nonetheless, the stability of this line-up was ruptured following the release of Dark Endless when both Dread and Richard Kalm departed from the band. Thence, Av Gravf assumed the additional position of vocalist while Roger 'B. War' Svensson assumed the position of bass player, consequently recording their second full-length album, Those of the Unlight, in April 1993, again being mixed by the aforementioned Swanö. Subsequently released on 1 October 1993, Those of the Unlight demarcated a noteworthy sonic excursion for the band, as this album manifested a more melodic black metal sound that repudiated the death metal undergirding of Marduk's body of work hitherto. The band elaborated upon this style on Opus Nocturne, released on 12 December 1994, which, concerning personnel, was signified by the addition of Fredrik Andersson on drums, with Av Gravf forsaking this position to concentrate specifically on vocal delivery, and the departure of Devo.

Stability had not yet been attained by the band, however, as Av Gravf opted to depart from Marduk in 1995, citing boredom as the primary instigator for this decision. Wherefore, Marduk recruited Erik 'Legion' Hagstedt, formerly of Swedish black metal band Ophthalamia, as vocalist. This development was further characterised by the band opting to record their fourth full-length album, Heaven Shall Burn... When We Are Gathered, with Peter Tägtgren of Hypocrisy fame at The Abyss Studio in January 1996, antecedent to the album's release on 1 July 1996.

This line-up of the band, with the exception of Fredrik Andersson departing in 2002 only to be replaced by Emil Dragutinovic, remained largely unscathed, releasing Nightwing, Panzer Division Marduk, La Grande Danse Macabre, and World Funeral, all of which the aforementioned Tägtgren mixed, in 1998, 1999, 2001, and 2003 respectively. Nonetheless, attributing his decision to both dissatisfaction with the band's musical direction and the diminishment of interpersonal relations within the band, Legion departed from the band in 2003, followed by B. War the subsequent year. Consequently, Legion was replaced by Daniel 'Mortuus' Rostén, renowned for his work within Funeral Mist, while Devo returned to the band, this time assuming the position of bassist.

In September 2016, Marduk intended to tour the United States with Carach Angren, Rotting Christ, and Necronomicon but was forced to cancel this endeavour as a result of unresolved delays in acquiring visas. In late February 2017, Marduk's prospective show at Oakland was cancelled by the venue for fears of security issues after a local anti-fascist group targeted the band and reportedly threatened the venue staff. In April of 2018, accusations of neo-Nazi sympathies resurfaced after the news site  published an article revealing that Fredrik Widigs and Daniel Rostén had placed orders from the Nordic Resistance Movement web shop, according to leaked files from NRM servers. The band have since denied these accusations, as well as any connection to the Nordic Resistance Movement.

Marduk released their latest studio album, Viktoria, on 22 June 2018. In 2019, Devo announced that he was leaving the band to focus on studio work, being replaced by Joel Lindholm in 2020.

Musical style and lyrical themes
The band's two initial releases, the 1991 EP, Fuck Me Jesus, and their debut album, Dark Endless, combine black metal with death metal. The band's second and third albums Those of the Unlight and Opus Nocturne, showed a more melodic black metal approach, with the latter hinting at a more chaotic, blast beat-driven style that would be further explored on subsequent albums like Heaven Shall Burn... When We Are Gathered, Nightwing, and Panzer Division Marduk.

Concerning the thematic nature of Marduk's lyrics, the lyrics primarily incorporate Satanism, anti-Christianity, blasphemy, death, Third Reich history, and World War II. Marduk began incorporating the war themes on their 1999 album, Panzer Division Marduk, which continued on in later years such as "The Hangman of Prague" on 2004's Plague Angel, the title being a reference to Reinhard Heydrich — second in command of the SS — in his capacity as the de facto Reichsprotektor of Bohemia and Moravia.

Members

Current members 
 Evil (Morgan Steinmeyer Håkansson) – guitars (1990–present)
 Mortuus (Daniel Rostén) – vocals (2004–present)
 Bloodhammer (Simon Schilling) – drums (2019–present)
 Joel Lindholm – bass (2020–present)

Former members 
 Af Gravf (Joakim Göthberg) – drums (1990–1993), vocals (1993–1995)
 Dread (Andreas Axelsson) – vocals (1990–1993)
 Rikard Kalm – bass (1990–1992)
 B. War (Roger Svensson) – bass (1992–2004)
 Devo (Magnus Andersson) – guitars (1992–1994), bass (2004–2019)
 Legion (Erik Hagstedt) – vocals (1994–2003)
 Froding (Fredrik Andersson) – drums (1993–2002)
 Emil Dragutinovic – drums (2002–2006)
 Lars Broddesson – drums (2006–2013)
 Fredrik Widigs – drums (2013–2018)

Live members 
 Kim Osara – guitars (1995–1996)
 Peter Tägtgren – guitars (1996)

Timeline

Discography

Studio albums
 Dark Endless (1992)
 Those of the Unlight (1993)
 Opus Nocturne (1994)
 Heaven Shall Burn... When We Are Gathered (1996)
 Nightwing (1998)
 Panzer Division Marduk (1999)
 La Grande Danse Macabre (2001)
 World Funeral (2003)
 Plague Angel (2004)
 Rom 5:12 (2007)
 Wormwood (2009)
 Serpent Sermon (2012)
 Frontschwein (2015)
 Viktoria (2018)
 Memento Mori (2023)

Live albums and compilations
 Live in Germania (1997)
 Infernal Eternal (2000)
 Blackcrowned (2002)
 Warschau (2006)

Demos and EPs
 Fuck Me Jesus (1991)
 Glorification (1996)
 Here's No Peace (1997)
 Obedience (2000)
 Deathmarch (2004)
 Iron Dawn (2011)

Singles
 "Slay the Nazarene" (2002)
 "Hearse" (2003)
 "Souls for Belial" (2012)
 "Werwolf" (2018)

DVDs
 Funeral Marches and Warsongs (2004)
 Blackcrowned (2005)
 Blood Puke Salvation (2006)

References

External links

 
 
 Marduk on BestBlackMetalAlbums.com
 Marduk at Encyclopaedia Metallum

Musical groups established in 1990
Swedish black metal musical groups
Extreme metal musical groups